This is a list of football clubs located in Greece and the leagues and divisions they are competing in for 2022–23 season.

Super League Greece 1

Super League Greece 2

North Group

South Group

Gamma Ethniki

Group 1

Group 2

Group 3

Group 4

Group 5

Other clubs
Amateur clubs participating in local championships. Italic indicates inactive or defunct club.

 
Greece
Clubs
Football clubs